The 2016 South American Trampoline Championships were held in Bogotá, Colombia, November 26–29, 2016. The competition was organized by the Colombian Gymnastics Federation, and approved by the International Gymnastics Federation.

Medalists

References

2016 in gymnastics
Trampoline,2016
International gymnastics competitions hosted by Colombia
2016 in Colombian sport